Ankamali Pig is an indigenous breed of pig found in Kerala, India. This black pig of Kerala is now seen as an endangered breed.

References

Pig breeds
Fauna of Kerala